Dean McLaughlin may refer to:

Dean McLaughlin (writer) (born 1931), American science fiction writer
Dean Benjamin McLaughlin (1901–1965), American astronomer